The Suzuki DR-Z Series includes the following motorcycles:

 Suzuki DR-Z50
 Suzuki DR-Z70
 Suzuki DR-Z110
 Suzuki DR-Z125
 Suzuki DR-Z125L
 Suzuki DR-Z250
 Suzuki DR-Z400E
 Suzuki DR-Z400S
 Suzuki DR-Z400SM

DR-Z Series